Wah Yan College, Kowloon (WYK; ; demonym: Wahyanite, pl.: Wahyanites) is a Catholic secondary school for boys run by the Chinese Province of the Society of Jesus. It is located in Kowloon, Hong Kong and is a grant-in-aid secondary school using English as the primary medium of instruction. The total land area of its campus is among the largest for Hong Kong secondary schools and it’s one of the most prestigious schools in Hong Kong.

History

Formative years
Established on 1 December 1924 as a branch of Wah Yan College, Hong Kong by Mr. Peter Tsui Yan Sau (徐仁壽, formerly a teacher at St. Joseph's College), Wah Yan College Kowloon is one of the oldest and most prestigious secondary schools in Hong Kong, and was the first English-speaking college to be administered by local Chinese. During the 1930s, Mr. Tsui, himself a devout Catholic, saw the need of the pupils for greater spiritual guidance, and decided to gradually hand over the administration to the incoming Jesuits who were looking to serve in some local educational establishments. Besides the two Wah Yan Colleges, the Jesuits also sought to form a Catholic University in Hong Kong. But with the University of Hong Kong already established in 1911, the Jesuit fathers turned to organizing a Catholic hostel for its male students, which became Ricci Hall of the University . Mr. Tsui left Hong Kong and became a successful rubber planter and hotelier in Kota Kinabalu, British North Borneo (now Sabah, Malaysia). He died in Hong Kong on 19 February 1981, at the age of ninety three.

Pre-war developments
Before the Second World War, the school was located on Portland Street and then moved to Nelson Street in 1928. Under the auspices of A. E. Wood, Secretary for Education, the school was added to the Grant List and hence under Government subsidies. A satellite campus was opened on Austin Road 103 to cater to students in senior year. The premises became Tak Sun Primary School after the war. A South China Morning Post article in 1928 reported WYK to be the largest school in Hong Kong with a student population of 500. Despite new facilities, however, seniors had to cross Victoria Harbour for laboratory lessons at the Wah Yan College, Hong Kong.

In 1941 when Hong Kong was attacked by the Japanese forces, the Jesuits of the College helped organise the evacuation of the Kowloon civilians to the Island as they closed down the school. During the occupation, the Japanese prohibited its resumption on political grounds. The Nelson Street campus was so thoroughly looted that Mr. Chow Ching-nam (周淸霖), then Principal, could only salvage a small portion of school registers and documents, and the students had to bring in their own chairs when the College reopened after the war.

Expansion and maturity
Around 1947, the school authorities began the search for a new campus as its enrolment further increased. A proposed acquisition of a site on Ho Man Tin Hill Road was turned down. After negotiations with the Government of Hong Kong, a piece of former paddy field was granted and it moved to the current premises on Waterloo Road in 1952. This portion of land was large by Hong Kong standards, making WYK one of the largest campus in the urban Hong Kong area. This precedent was soon followed in the case of land provision for the Hong Kong campus, where the plot granted by the Government was also of significant size. The present campus was opened by the then Governor Sir Alexander Grantham in 1953. In 2005 a new annex of WYK was opened providing new science labs, a music room, a computer-assisted learning (CAL) room, and a student activity room.

Mr. Laurence Tam (譚志成), an arts teacher during the late 1960s, pioneered a new Chinese ink painting movement which he integrated in his curriculum experimentally. He left the school to work as a curator at the Hong Kong Museum of Art in 1971.

The school hymn of Wah Yan College Kowloon is Our Captain and Our King. The origin of the hymn is unclear, but it is believed to have originated from Northern England back in the 18th century.

Results of Public Examinations 
Wah Yan College, Kowloon has produced 8 perfect scorers "10As" in the history of Hong Kong Certificate of Education Examination (HKCEE) and 1 "Top Scorers" /  "Super Top Scorers" in Hong Kong Diploma of Secondary Education Examination (HKDSE).

7 x 5** "Top Scorers" are candidates who obtained perfect scores of 5** in each of the four core subjects and three electives.

8 x 5** "Super Top Scorers" are candidates who obtained seven Level 5** in four core subjects and three electives, and an additional Level 5** in the Mathematics Extended (M1/M2) module.

Hong Kong Certificate of Education Examination (HKCEE) 

 1988: 10As: LO Man-chu, awardee of Sir Edward Youde Memorial Medals 1988.  
 1991: 10As: William WOO Chun-fai, SCMP Student of the Year 1992. 
 1995: 10As: David TANG Yue-tan, graduated with Juris Doctor from Harvard Law School.  
 1997: 10As: Anthony LUI Kai Chung, Awardee of Hong Kong Schools Alumni Federation Scholarship to study Computer Science and Engineering at UCLA.     
 1998: 10As: Alan LUI Siu-lun 
 1998: 10As: CHAN Ka-fai 
 2003: 10As: Jeff SZE Chun-fai, admitted to B.S. in Mathematics at Stanford University.  
 2003: 10As: Dominic KWOK Tsz-yeung, admitted to HKU MBBS.

Hong Kong Diploma of Secondary Education Examination (HKDSE) 

 2014: "7 x 5** Top Scorer": Yii Pun-kit, admitted to HKU MBBS.

Notable alumni

Current Legislative Council Members
 TSE Paul (謝偉俊), member of the Legislative Council (Tourism Functional Constituency)
 Ho Kai-ming (何啟明), member of the Legislative Council (Labour Functional Constituency)

Politics
 LEE Martin Chu-ming (李柱銘), founding chairman of the Democratic Party
 LEE Yeh-kwong (李業廣), former member of the Executive Council of Hong Kong and former Chairman of Hong Kong Exchanges and Clearing Limited
 LAU Hon-chuen (劉漢銓), former chairman of the Hong Kong Progressive Alliance
LEE John Ka-Chiu (李家超), Chief Executive of Hong Kong
 LEE Philip S. (李紹麟), former Lieutenant Governor of Manitoba, Canada
 LEONG Alan Kah-kit (梁家傑), former leader of the Civic Party, former chairman of the Hong Kong Bar Association and candidate for Hong Kong Chief Executive Election in 2007
 SHIU Sin-por, head of the Central Policy Unit
 TO James Kun-sun (涂謹申), former member of the Legislative Council (Kowloon West)
 WONG Ernest Kwok Chung (王國忠), member of the New South Wales Legislative Council, Australia

Law
 LEONG Arthur Siu-chung (梁紹中) GBS, Chief Judge of the High Court (2000-2003)
 Neoh, Anthony, senior counsel
 Ho, Ambrose Pui-Him, senior counsel
 Leong, Alan Kah-Kit, senior counsel
 Lee, Robert, senior counsel
 Hui, Martin, senior counsel
 Luk, Simon, Partner and Chair of Asia Practice at Winston & Strawn LLP

Business
 CHAN John Cho-chak (陳祖澤), former chairman of Hong Kong Jockey Club; former managing director of Kowloon Motor Bus (1933) Ltd.
 NG Stephen Tin-hoi (吳天海), deputy chairman and managing director of Wharf Holdings Limited (九龍倉集團有限公司); chairman, deputy chairman of Wheelock and Company Limited (會德豐有限公司)
 YING Michael Lee-Yuen (刑李源), former chairman of Esprit Holdings Limited.
 YUEN Tin-fan (袁天凡), former CEO of Hong Kong Stock Exchange

Medicine
 KWONG Yok Lam (鄺沃林), Chair Professor in Haematology and Haematological Oncology at the Department of Medicine of the University of Hong Kong
 LIU Chi Leung (廖子良), Honorary Clinical Professor at the Department of Surgery of the University of Hong Kong, expert in hepatobilary and pancreatic surgery and liver transplantation
 LAM Ching Wan (林青雲), Clinical Professor at the Department of Pathology at the University of Hong Kong, expert in chemical pathology and rare diseases
 WONG William Chi Wai (黃志威), Clinical Associate Professor & Chief of Research at the Department of Family Medicine and Primary Care of the University of Hong Kong, specialist in Family Medicine
 CHEUNG Ka Shing, Michael (張嘉盛), Clinical Assistant Professor at the Department of Medicine of the University of Hong Kong, specialist in Gastroenterology and Hepatology
 NG Ho Keung (吳浩強), Chair Professor and former Chairman of the Department of Anatomical and Cellular Pathology of the Chinese University of Hong Kong, former Associate Dean (Education) of the Faculty of Medicine of the Chinese University of Hong Kong
 LAU Yun Wong James (劉潤皇), Professor of Surgery and Chairman of the Department of Surgery of the Chinese University of Hong Kong
 WONG Wai Sun, Vincent (黃煒燊), Professor of Medicine and Head of Gastroenterology and Hepatology at the Department of Medicine and Therapeutics of the Chinese University of Hong Kong, Assistant Dean (Development) of the Faculty of Medicine of the Chinese University of Hong Kong
 LEE Ablert (李大拔), Clinical Professor at the Jockey Club School of Public Health and Primary Care of the Chinese University of Hong Kong
 LI Kam Tao Philip (李錦滔), President of the Hong Kong College of Physicians, Chief of Nephrology of the Department of Medicine and Therapeutics of the Prince of Wales Hospital, Honorary Professor of Medicine at the Department of Medicine and Therapeutics of the Chinese University of Hong Kong
 TSE Tak Fu (謝德富), former President of the World Heart Federation, former Chief of Cardiology of the Department of Medicine of the University of Hong Kong
 CHIU Man Chun (趙孟準), former Chief of Service of the Department of Paediatrics of  Princess Margaret Hospital, Honorary Clinical Professor at the Department of Paediatrics and Adolescent Medicine of the University of Hong Kong, author of the famous book《醫生札記》
 KO Pat Sing Tony (高拔陞), Chief Executive of the Hospital Authority, specialist in Geriatric Medicine
 HO Lei Ming Raymond (何理明), Head of the Health Promotion Branch of the Centre for Health Protection

Academia
 MAK Tak Wah (麥德華)(class of 1962), Professor at the University of Toronto and the University of Hong Kong, Fellow of the Royal Society, Fellow of the Royal Society of Chemistry, Fellow of the Royal Society of Canada, Foreign Associate of the United States National Academy of Sciences, Founding Fellow of the Hong Kong Academy of Sciences, Awardee of the Canada Gairdner International Award; scientist (discoverer of T cell receptors, a key component of the human immune system),
 YEH Anthony Gar On (葉嘉安), Chair Professor in Urban Planning and Geographic Information Systems at the Department of Urban Planning and Design and former Dean of the Graduate School of the University of Hong Kong, Fellow of the Chinese Academy of Sciences, Fellow of the Hong Kong Academy of Sciences
 WONG Yu Chim Richard (王于漸), Provost and Deputy Vice-Chancellor and Chair Professor of Economics at the Faculty of Business and Economics of the University of Hong Kong
 FUNG Chin Wan Peter (馮戩雲), Emeritus Professor in Medical Physics, former Chair Professor in Medical Physics at the Department of Medicine and Department of Physics of the University of Hong Kong
 NG Ho Keung (吳浩強), Chair Professor at the Department of Anatomical and Cellular Pathology at the Chinese University of Hong Kong
 TSO Wung-Wai (曹宏威), an adjunct professor at the Chinese University of Hong Kong, also an active politician in Hong Kong
 WONG John Y. (黃宇和), Emeritus Professor at the Department of History of the University of Sydney and Fellow of the Academy of Social Sciences in Australia
 TONG Wai Keung James (湯維強), Professor at the Department of Political Science and Former Director of the Center for East Asian Studies of the University of California, Los Angeles 
 HAU Kit Tai (侯傑泰), Emeritus Professor and Former Chair Professor at the Department of Education Psychology, and Former Pro-Vice-Chancellor of the Chinese University of Hong Kong 
 LEUNG Tsang, a professor of electrical engineering and computer science at the University of Michigan, Ann Arbor. 
 SO Ting Pat Albert (蘇廷弼).

Art and performance
 CHAN Koon Chung (陳冠中), author of "The Fat Years (盛世)"
 Kenneth TSANG (曾江), actor in Hollywood productions such as Die Another Day
 Brendan Lai (黎達沖), Grand Master of the Northern Seven Stars Praying Mantis Kung Fu system, 8th generation, a disciple of Wong Hon Fan (黃漢勛).
 CHAN Ka Hei (陳家曦), local composer

See also

Education in Hong Kong
Wah Yan College, Hong Kong
Wah Yan One Family Foundation
List of secondary schools in Hong Kong
List of buildings and structures in Hong Kong
 List of Jesuit sites
Fo Pang

References

External links

 Official site
 WYK Past Students' Association
 Wah Yan International Network
 Wah Yan Boys' Community 
 WAH YAN COLLEGE KOWLOON ALUMNI ASSOCIATION OF ONTARIO, Canada

Yau Ma Tei
Catholic secondary schools in Hong Kong
Jesuit secondary schools in Hong Kong
Boys' schools in Hong Kong
Educational institutions established in 1924
Wah Yan
King's Park, Hong Kong
1924 establishments in Hong Kong